The Summit Conference is a high school athletic conference comprising small-size high schools located in southwest Missouri. The conference members are located in Laclede, Ozark, Webster, and Wright counties.

Members

References

Missouri high school athletic conferences
High school sports conferences and leagues in the United States